Wilhelmine of Prussia (Friederike Luise Wilhelmine; 18 November 1774 – 12 October 1837) was the first Queen consort of the Netherlands as the first wife of King William I of the Netherlands. She had a modest public role but acted as a patron of the arts.

Biography

Princess Wilhelmine was born in Potsdam. She was the fourth child of eight born to King Frederick William II of Prussia and Queen Frederica Louisa. Her upbringing was dominated by the strict regime of her great-uncle, Frederick the Great, but in general very little is known about her youth. She was given a conventional education for a girl of her time and tutored in needlework and the arts, and described as pretty and sweet.

Marriage
On 1 October 1791, she married her cousin William of the Netherlands, son of Stadtholder William V, Prince of Orange and Princess Wilhelmina of Prussia, in Berlin.  The marriage was arranged as a part of an alliance between the House of Orange and Prussia, but it was also, in fact, a love match and became a happy one.  The young couple went to live at Noordeinde Palace in The Hague. 

In 1795, the French invaded the Dutch Republic, and the princely family went into exile.  They first stayed in England, and from 1796 in Berlin.  In Berlin, the couple lived with her birth family in royal state in the "Niederländischen Palais" ('Dutch Palace').   In 1806, Wilhelmine was again forced to flee from the French army, and settled under difficult economic circumstances in Poland.  

Wilhelmine returned to The Hague at the beginning of 1814.

Queen

Wilhelmine became Queen of the Netherlands in 1815.  At the time, the Netherlands included the present-day country of Belgium.  The court divided their time between the two and divided their winters between The Hague and Brussels, and their summers between Het Loo and Laeken.   Wilhelmine personally visited Berlin once a year until her death, where she continued to live in the "Niederländischen Palast" during her visit.  She participated in royal representation during her stay in Berlin, as well as attending to her estates in Silesia.  

Queen Wilhelmine was modest and stayed in the background, and she did not play any dominant role as queen.   She was beloved by her family but was not a popular queen, and was criticized in The Netherlands for isolating the royal family, and later Belgium for her German fashion.  Beginning in 1820, her health worsened, and after 1829, she was rarely seen in public, though she continued her trips to Berlin and visiting relatives.  

She was interested in painting, attended exhibitions, and helped to protect museums and support artists.   She was herself a student of art and regarded as a talented dilettante, ultimately being inducted as an honorary member to the Royal Academy of Fine Arts in Amsterdam.  She was a student of Friedrich Bury, financed an Italian study trip for Bonaventura Genelli, and supported the renovation of the royal museum. 

She died at Noordeinde Palace in The Hague in 1837, aged 62, and is entombed in the New Church in Delft.

Issue

Ancestry

References

Wilhelmina van Pruisen (in Dutch)

External links

Royal House of the Netherlands and Grand-Ducal House of Luxembourg

|-

|-

1774 births
1837 deaths
Dutch queens consort
Grand Ducal Consorts of Luxembourg
Princesses of Orange
Dutch royalty
 House of Hohenzollern
House of Orange-Nassau
Prussian princesses
People from Potsdam
Burials in the Royal Crypt at Nieuwe Kerk, Delft
William I of the Netherlands
Daughters of kings